

169001–169100 

|-id=078
| 169078 Chuckshaw ||  || Charles Shaw (born 1946), the mission director for the Hubble Space Telescope rescue mission STS-125. || 
|}

169101–169200 

|-id=184
| 169184 Jameslee ||  || James E. Lee (born 1958), NASA Marshall Spaceflight Center, served as the NASA Program Manager for the New Horizons mission to Pluto. || 
|}

169201–169300 

|-id=299
| 169299 Sirko ||  || Edwin Sirko (born 1978) is a former American astronomer with the Sloan Digital Sky Survey, known for his work on cosmological simulations. He was lead programmer on NASA's official computer game, Moonbase Alpha. || 
|}

169301–169400 

|-bgcolor=#f2f2f2
| colspan=4 align=center | 
|}

169401–169500 

|-bgcolor=#f2f2f2
| colspan=4 align=center | 
|}

169501–169600 

|-id=568
| 169568 Baranauskas ||  || Antanas Baranauskas (1835–1902), a Roman Catholic bishop, mathematician and poet who wrote one of the greatest works in Lithuanian literature, Anyksciu silelis (The Forest of Anyksciai). || 
|}

169601–169700 

|-bgcolor=#f2f2f2
| colspan=4 align=center | 
|}

169701–169800 

|-bgcolor=#f2f2f2
| colspan=4 align=center | 
|}

169801–169900 

|-id=834
| 169834 Hujie ||  || Hu Jie (born 1981), wife of Chinese astronomer Tao Chen, who discovered this minor planet || 
|}

169901–170000 

|-bgcolor=#f2f2f2
| colspan=4 align=center | 
|}

References 

169001-170000